Ned Vaughn (born November 20, 1964) is an American film and television actor who served as vice president of the Screen Actors Guild prior to becoming the founding executive vice president of SAG-AFTRA. He resigned that position on 21 August 2013, when he announced he would run as a Republican candidate for California's 66th State Assembly district, representing Los Angeles County's South Bay region. However, he later withdrew from the race.

Early life and education
Ned Vaughn was raised in Huntsville, Alabama with his sister Anna by their parents, Helen and Ed Vaughn. Vaughn's father was a news anchor and reporter for Huntsville's CBS Television affiliate (WHNT-TV) before starting his career as a civilian public affairs officer for the U.S. Army's Space and Missile Defense Command, which included work on Ronald Reagan's Strategic Defense Initiative, popularly known as Star Wars. Ned's mother, Helen, is an active professional artist whose early works were described as "celebrations of the many aspects of womanhood" and focusing on "the psychological truth of being female in today's society."

At age 10, Vaughn performed his first acting role in a community theater production of the musical Oliver!, staged in the  Von Braun Center's 2000-seat concert hall. Vaughn continued acting as he attended Lee High School and performed in several productions while attending Birmingham-Southern College. It was there that Vaughn decided to pursue acting as a career. He drove to New York with just $600 and initially stayed with a family acquaintance, making the commute to New York City from Peekskill.

While taking classes at HB Studio in Greenwich Village, Vaughn made ends meet by working as a doorman at New York's Wellington Hotel, which he described as a crash course in human nature.

Acting career
In January 1986, Vaughn booked his first professional job from his first audition: a Miami Vice-themed Pepsi commercial directed by Ridley Scott, which premiered during the 1986 Grammy Awards telecast. However, Vaughn's role did not appear in the final cut. Over the remainder of 1986, Vaughn was cast in more commercials and performed in the HB Playwrights Foundation production of K on K by Franz Kafka.

In February 1987, Vaughn was cast in his first starring film role in The Rescue, which also starred Kevin Dillon and featured James Cromwell. After filming was completed in New Zealand and Hong Kong, Vaughn moved to Los Angeles.

The same year, Vaughn joined the ABC television series China Beach, playing the role of Corporal Jeff Hyers. Throughout his career, Vaughn has gravitated toward characters who serve in the military (24, The Tuskegee Airmen, JAG, NCIS), law enforcement (Heroes, Frost/Nixon), politics (The Unit), and Starfleet (Star Trek: The Next Generation).

In 1995, Vaughn appeared in Apollo 13. In 1998, Vaughn performed in Hellcab at the Tivoli Theatre in Dublin, Ireland during the Dublin Theatre Festival.

In addition to his film work, Vaughn has appeared in a wide variety of television programs, with nearly one hundred episodes to his credit. In 2011, Vaughn provided the face and voice of LAPD Captain Gordon Leary in video game L.A. Noire, which was the first video game to be shown at the Tribeca Film Festival.

Screen Actors Guild / SAG-AFTRA leadership
In 2008, Vaughn campaigned to merge the Screen Actors Guild with the American Federation of Television and Radio Artists (AFTRA). Vaughn was elected to the SAG board in 2008 and became SAG 1st Vice President in 2010. During his tenure, Vaughn focused on uniting SAG and AFTRA. In January 2012, it was announced that a merger referendum would be presented to members of both unions. Merger opponents and SAG board members Martin Sheen and Ed Harris, along with former SAG president Ed Asner, filed a federal lawsuit to block the referendum, but the vote went ahead. When their case was dropped, Vaughn commented, "Dropping this frivolous lawsuit is the first good decision the plaintiffs have made." On 30 March 2012, the merger passed overwhelmingly, with 86% of AFTRA members and 82% of SAG members voting to create SAG-AFTRA, the largest union representing performers in the entertainment and media industries. Vaughn was the organization's founding executive vice president, serving as the second-ranking and only Republican national officer of the 160,000-member organization.

Politics
On 21 August 2013, Vaughn announced he would run as a Republican candidate for California's 66th State Assembly district, representing Los Angeles County's South Bay region. On the same day, he resigned his position as SAG-AFTRA executive vice president in order to focus on his Assembly campaign. SAG-AFTRA president Ken Howard remarked, "We may not have the same views on politics, but Ned is one of the finest leaders I've ever known. His decision to run for public office can only be a good thing for California.” Vaughn's decision to run was also praised by U.S. House of Representatives Majority Whip, Congressman Kevin McCarthy (R-Calif.), of Bakersfield, who said, "Ned Vaughn is the type of leader California needs: a proven problem-solver and an effective communicator who can give voice to millions of Californians who are tired of seeing our state fall behind." On 16 October 2013 Vaughn announced that he was withdrawing his candidacy.

Personal life
Vaughn married his wife, Adelaide, in 1997. They have five children and live in Augusta, Georgia. In announcing his State Assembly campaign, Vaughn cited his children's future as a primary reason for his entry into public service.

Filmography

References

External links
 
 Ned Vaughn for California Assembly

1964 births
Living people
American male film actors
American male television actors
Actors from Huntsville, Alabama
20th-century American male actors
21st-century American male actors
Alabama Republicans
California Republicans